Graphics are two-dimensional images.

Graphic(s) or The Graphic may also refer to:

 Graphic (TV series), Canadian news program
 Graphics (album) by Joe McPhee
 Treva Spontaine and The Graphic, an American indie band

Computing
 Computer graphics, generating images using computers
 Video game graphics, displaying video game content

Publications

 The Graphic (later The Daily Graphic and The National Graphic), London, UK (1869–1932)
 The Daily Graphic (New York, 1873–89)
 Daily Graphic (Ghana) (since 1950)
 New York Graphic (1924–32)
 The Newberg Graphic, Newberg, Oregon, United States (since 1888)
 Sunday Graphic, London, UK (1927–60)

Places
 Graphic, Arkansas,  unincorporated community in Crawford County, Arkansas, United States

See also
Grafik (magazine), British art magazine
 Graphix, an imprint of Scholastic Corporation
 Graph (disambiguation)